Christmas Spirit is the sixteenth studio album by American singer-songwriter Donna Summer, and her only Christmas album. It was released by Mercury Records on October 4, 1994, in the United States. Christmas Spirit was produced by Michael Omartian, who had collaborated with Summer on the albums She Works Hard for the Money (1983) and Cats Without Claws (1984), both as a producer and composer. Christmas Spirit consists of traditional and well-known Christmas songs and carols, as well as new original songs and a cover of Amy Grant's "Breath of Heaven (Mary's Song)".

Christmas Spirit earned mixed reviews from music critics, many of whom found it solidly crafted but uninspired. Commercially, the album failed to chart during its original release. By 2006, it had sold more than 46,000 copies in the US. In 2005, Christmas Spirit was re-issued by Universal Music on the Mercury label. Re-titled 20th Century Masters: The Best of Donna Summer: The Christmas Collection in 2007, it entered the US Top Holiday Albums at number 40.

Critical reception

Allmusic editor Steven McDonald found that "Summer's contribution to the Christmas album market sounds good, courtesy of producer Michael Omartian, but it's about what you'd expect from the combination of Omartian and Summer: nicely produced, bland versions of songs such as "White Christmas," "I'll Be Home for Christmas," and "O Holy Night." Summer gives it a good try, however, and the album does have some appeal, if little forcefulness." Tony Cummings from Cross Rhythms called that album "a major let down. The choice of songs is chronically uninspired with both secular and sacred numbers being chronically over recorded [...] In fact, throughout the album the one-time disco diva hardly has a decent rhythm to sing across such is the dominance of the strings. An album only for saccharine Yuletide tastes." Vibes Amy Linden felt that Christmas Spirit "is drenched in strings and celestial choirs, but is a bit heavy-handed and lacks the old ho ho ho — which somehow befits this disco queen turned born-again Christian."

Charts performance
Upon release, Christmas Spirit failed to chart on any Billboard chart the United States. By 2006, it had sold more than 46,000 units domestically, according to Nielsen Soundscan. In 2007, the Universal Music-produced reissue of the album entered the US Top Holiday Albums at number 40.

Track listing 
All tracks produced by Michael Omartian.

Personnel 
 Donna Summer – vocals
 Michael Omartian – acoustic piano (1, 2, 4, 5, 7-10), synthesizers (2, 4, 7, 10), keyboards (6), organ (9)
 Dann Huff – guitars (2, 4, 5, 7, 9, 10)
 Jerry McPherson – guitars (2, 4, 5, 7, 9, 10)
 Danny O'Lannerghty – bass (2, 4, 5, 7, 9, 10)
 Chester Thompson – drums (2, 4, 5, 7, 9, 10)
 Ronn Huff – orchestra arrangements and conductor (1, 3, 8)
 The Nashville String Machine – orchestra (1, 3, 8)
 Heritage Children's Choir – children's choir (3, 4, 10)
 Mary P. Stephenson – children's choir conductor (3, 4, 10)
 Rachel Gaines – additional vocals (4)
 Amanda Omartian – additional vocals (4)
 Akil Thompson – additional vocals (4)
 Lisa Bevill – vocals (7)
 Kim Fleming – vocals (7)
 Michael Mellett – vocals (7)

Choir vocalists
 Travis Cottrell (3)
 Sheldon "Butch" Curry (3, 5, 10)
 Rick Gibson (3)
 David Holloway (3, 5, 10)
 Mark Ivey (3, 5, 10)
 Russell Mauldin (3, 5, 10)
 Michael Mellett (3, 5, 9, 10)
 Michael Omartian (3)
 Guy Penrod (3, 5, 9, 10)
 Gary Robinson (3, 5, 10)
 Chuck Sullivan (3)
 Dave Williamson (3, 5, 10)
 Mary George (5, 10)
 Lisa Glasgow (5, 10)
 Stephanie Hall (5, 10)
 Sarah Huffman (5, 10)
 Tammy Jansen (5, 10)
 Ellen Musick (5, 10)
 Leah Taylor (5, 10)
 Melodie Tunney (5, 10)
 Kim Fleming (9)
 Donna McElroy (9)
 Angelo Petrucci (9)
 Veronica Petrucci (9)
 Suzanne Schwartz (9)
 Ken "Scat" Springs (9)
 Roz Thompson (9)

Production and Technical 
 Terry Christian – engineer, mixing 
 Jim Dineen – additional engineer 
 Robert Charles – assistant engineer 
 Larry Jefferies – assistant engineer 
 Scott Link – assistant engineer 
 King Williams – assistant engineer 
 Mark Capps – assistant mix engineer 
 John Dickson – assistant mix engineer 
 Gerardo Bernard – executive coordinator 
 Suzy Martinez – production coordinator 
 Giulio Turturro – design
 Harry Langdon – cover photography

Charts

References 

Donna Summer albums
Albums produced by Michael Omartian
Christmas albums by American artists
Gospel Christmas albums
1994 Christmas albums
Mercury Records albums